Megachile paucipunctulata is a species of bee in the family Megachilidae. It was described by W. F. Kirby in 1900.

References

Paucipunctulata
Insects described in 1900